Altha Jeanne Stewart is an American psychiatrist. In 2015, Stewart was recruited by the University of Tennessee Health Science Center to establish and direct the Center for Health in Justice Involved Youth. While there, she became the first African American president of the American Psychiatric Association.

Early life and education
Stewart was born and raised in South Memphis, Memphis, Tennessee to a librarian mother and civil service father. Growing up, she attended Carver High School and Sacred Heart High School for Girls. Following high school, she was among the first class of women admitted to Christian Brothers University before earning her medical degree from Temple University School of Medicine and completing her residency in general psychiatry at Temple University School of Medicine. Stewart was later named to the Tennessee Independent Colleges and Universities Association's Hall of Fame by CBU and earned an honorary degree from Regis College.

Career
Following her medical degree, residency, and fellowship, Stewart served as the City of Philadelphia's Department of Public Health's medical director from 1983 to 1991. She was then appointed to the rank of senior deputy commissioner for the New York State Office of Mental Health & Alcoholism Services. From there, Stewart served as the executive director for the Detroit-Wayne Community Mental Health Agency from 1999 to 2002. Upon moving back to Memphis, Stewart managed a federal grant for Shelby County, which focused on children with mental illness and their risk for going into the juvenile justice system. By 2011, she was appointed the executive director of the Just Care Family Network where she became an advocate for youth and families.

Stewart eventually left the public sector and was recruited by the University of Tennessee Health Science Center (UTHSC) to establish and direct the Center for Health in Justice Involved Youth. While serving in this role, she was selected to direct Phase II of  Shelby Count's initiative, which was referred to as Defending Childhood Shelby. As a result of her efforts, Stewart received the 2017 James G. Hughes Community Advocate Award from the Memphis Child Advocacy Center and was honored as a Memphis Legend. Beyond UTHSC, Stewart is also active within the American Psychiatric Association (APA) and served on their Board of Trustees, Conflict of Interest Committee and the Minority Fellowship Selection Committee, and Joint Reference Committee and the Council on Advocacy and Government Relations.

In 2018, Stewart was appointed the first African American to lead the APA as president, for a one year term. Upon stepping down, she was named the senior associate dean for Community Health Engagement in the University of Tennessee College of Medicine. In 2021, Stewart joined the Jed Foundation Advisory Board to advise on strategies in mental health and suicide prevention. She also joined the University of Tennessee College of Social Work's Board of Visitors. Later that year, Stewart received the Solomon Carter Fuller Award from the APA as a "Black citizen who has pioneered in an area that has significantly improved the quality of life for Black people."

References

Living people
Year of birth missing (living people)
Christian Brothers University alumni
Temple University School of Medicine alumni
University of Tennessee faculty
American psychiatrists
American women psychiatrists
African-American women physicians
People from Memphis, Tennessee
21st-century African-American people
21st-century African-American women